is a Japanese football player. She plays for Chifure AS Elfen Saitama. She played for Japan national team.

Club career
Ito was born in Nerima, Tokyo on July 20, 1983. She joined NTV Beleza (later Nippon TV Beleza) in 1999. She was selected Best Eleven in 2001 and 2002. End of 2008 season, she left the club, but in 2010, she came back and she played until 2012. From 2013, she played for Chifure AS Elfen Saitama (2013-2014, 2016), INAC Kobe Leonessa (2015) and Nippon Sport Science University Fields Yokohama (2017). She is currently playing for Chifure AS Elfen Saitama from 2018.

National team career
On August 5, 2001, when Ito was 18 years old, she debuted for the Japan national team against China. In 2002, she was selected by the Japan U-20 national team for the 2002 U-19 World Championship. She played 13 games and scored 3 goals for Japan until 2012.

National team statistics

References

External links

1983 births
Living people
Asia University (Japan) alumni
Association football people from Tokyo
Japanese women's footballers
Japan women's international footballers
Nadeshiko League players
Nippon TV Tokyo Verdy Beleza players
Chifure AS Elfen Saitama players
INAC Kobe Leonessa players
Nippon Sport Science University Fields Yokohama players
Women's association football midfielders
Footballers at the 2002 Asian Games
Asian Games bronze medalists for Japan
Asian Games medalists in football
Medalists at the 2002 Asian Games